Netherburn railway station served Netherburn, a village in South Lanarkshire, Scotland. It opened in 1866 and was closed in 1951.

References

Disused railway stations in South Lanarkshire
Railway stations in Great Britain closed in 1866
Railway stations in Great Britain closed in 1951
Former Caledonian Railway stations